The following radio stations broadcast on AM frequency 1210 kHz: 1210 AM is a United States clear-channel frequency. WPHT Philadelphia is the dominant Class A station on 1210 AM.

In Argentina
 Del Promesero in José C Paz, Buenos Aires
 LRI229 in Las Flores

In Canada

In Mexico
 XECOPA-AM in Copainalá, Chiapas
 XECSAC-AM in El Arenal, Jalisco
 XEPUE-AM in Puebla (city), Puebla

In the United States
Stations in bold are clear-channel stations.

References

Lists of radio stations by frequency